The 2023 NCAA Division III football season was the component of the 2023 college football season organized by the NCAA at the Division III level in the United States. The regular season will begin on September 2 and will end on November 12. This will be the 50th season that the NCAA has sponsored a Division III championship. 

North Central (IL) is  the defending national champions.

The season's playoffs will be played between November X and December X, culminating in the national championship—also known as the Stagg Bowl—at the George Turner Stadium in Humble, Texas.

Conference changes and new programs

Membership changes

Conference standings

Postseason

Teams

Automatic bids (27)

At-large bids (5)

Bracket

* - Host team

See also 

 2023 NCAA Division I FBS football season
 2023 NCAA Division I FCS football season
 2023 NCAA Division II football season
 2023 NAIA football season

References 

2023 NCAA Division III football season